Mr Muscle is a British brand of hard-surface cleaners. It has been manufactured by S. C. Johnson & Son, since their purchase of Drackett from Bristol-Myers Squibb in October 1992. The original product—an aerosol oven cleaner—was developed at Drackett in 1986. The Mr Muscle product lineup has since expanded.

Oven cleaner

History
Oven cleaners at the time of introduction (1986) were generally similar to Reckitt & Colman's Easy-Off, the leading brand. A strong base, such as caustic soda, attacked grease by saponification. Surfactants attacked both grease and food spills. An abrasive may be present to help scour the oven. The product worked better if the oven was hot, although working in a fairly close space with hot oven cleaner fumes was unpleasant.

Appliance manufacturers offered continuous clean ovens, which had a special coating. Consumers, however, discovered these ovens were rarely cleaned by the process. Additionally, supplemental use of chemical cleaners destroyed the special coating that enabled continuous clean to function.

Manufacturers next offered self-cleaning ovens, which allows the oven to run at a special high temperature setting, effectively burning food residue to ash. Early self-cleaning ovens were not thoroughly satisfactory. At worst, they left carbon stuck to the oven surfaces. At best, they left carbon residue on the oven floor.

Industry legend has it that Drackett researchers, while trying to find a cold oven cleaner, found that ammonia would plasticize food spills, making them easier to remove. This took hours, however, during which period the ammonia would evaporate, halting the process. Looking for a less volatile chemical with the general characteristics of ammonia, they found that monoethanolamine had similar properties.

Monoethanolamine is a weak base, so it required the addition of caustic soda as well as surfactants and bentonite as a mild abrasive. Like most household cleaning aerosols, the propellant is a blend of propane and isobutane. Because the product required significant time to work properly, it was marketed as an overnight oven cleaner.

The product quickly grew to be the second best selling oven cleaner. The product's popularity was limited by the strong fumes it created, as well as the length of time required to thoroughly clean. Consumers were not thrilled at the prospect of awakening in the morning to the task of wiping chemicals, carbon, and grease out of their ovens.

Controversy
In September 1994, there was some controversy regarding Mr Muscle, after complaints over the potency of the cleaning agents within the product, which were thought to be unnecessarily high and of a level that could lead to potential health problems.

The study in the United Kingdom by the Welsh Regional Burns and Plastics Unit, Chepstow found:

The United States Department of Health and Human Services (HHS), which lists household product information for health and safety, lists the Health & Effects information taken from the Mr Muscle product label and/or the Material Safety Data Sheet (MSDS) prepared by the product manufacturer. Mr Muscle is rated as a scale 3 (serious) for Health and a 4 (severe) for Flammability (using the established HMIS, Hazardous Materials Identification System).

Other hard surface cleaners
The brand includes other hard surface cleaners. Products include bathroom and toilet cleaning, glass and surface cleaners, floor cleaners, kitchen cleaners and degreasers, and more. These products are sold in Europe, Asia, Latin America, and Africa under the brand names Mr Muscle or Mr. Musculo. The company also sells similar products that Mr Muscle have in other parts of the world including the United States under the Duck and Scrubbing Bubbles brands.

References

External links
 Mr Muscle official UK website
Mr Muscle named "The Most Hygienic Cleaner" in Turkey
 Mr Muscolo Italian Official Website
 NIH Household Product Database entry
 How Self Cleaning Ovens Work Article by HowStuffWorks.com
 U.S. Patent 4,167,488

Cleaning product brands
Products introduced in 1986
Reckitt brands
S. C. Johnson & Son brands
ja:カビキラー